The 2020 Kaohsiung mayoral recall vote was a recall election held on 6 June 2020 to recall the incumbent mayor of Kaohsiung, Han Kuo-yu. The recall was successful, as the number of agree votes (939,090) outnumbered disagree votes and exceeded the minimum requirement of 574,996. An acting mayor was appointed by the Executive Yuan and held office until 24 August 2020, nine days after a by-election was held.

The vote is the largest-scale recall vote in Taiwan in terms of electorate, and is the first ever successful recall of a mayor or magistrate.

Background
Han Kuo-yu was elected mayor of Kaohsiung City in the 24 November 2018 local election. However, his popularity quickly dwindled after he began campaigning for the 2020 Taiwanese presidential election, leading to a recall proposal on 26 December 2019. On 17 January 2020, a petition to recall Han cleared the first threshold with 28,560 signatures, exceeding the required 1% of the electorate (22,814 signatures).  On 7 April, the city's electoral commission verified that 377,662 of approximately 406,000 signatures collected in the second phase of the recall petition were valid, clearing the threshold of 10% of the electorate. The Central Election Commission certified the validity of collected signatures on 17 April, and scheduled a recall vote on 6 June 2020. 

Han contested the legality of the recall in court, claiming that petitioners had been collecting signatures before he had served a full year as mayor, in violation of Article 75 of the Civil Servants and Election and Recall Act. The motion was denied by the Taipei Administrative High Court on 17 April 2020. An appeal to the Taiwan Supreme Administrative Court was rejected on 7 May 2020. Han claimed that the recall vote would damage his reputation, interfere with his mayoral duties, burden other city officials, and delay municipal work programs. The Taipei High Administrative Court ruled against these arguments on 22 May.

Voting system
Residents of Kaohsiung City registered in the city continuously since 6 February 2020 and aged 20 or above on the day prior to the vote are eligible. The mayor is recalled if votes in favour of the recall outnumber those against and exceed one quarter of voters in the original electoral district (574,996).

Procedures and timetable
The Central Election Commission stated on 2 May 2020 that the 1,823 polling sites used in the 2018 mayoral election would be set up for the recall vote. The CEC released a statement by Han on 5 May, in which he emphasised the economic investment drawn to Kaohsiung during his mayoral administration. Polls were open from 08:00 to 16:00 on 6 June.

Opinion polling

Results

The motion to recall Han garnered 939,090 votes favouring recall and 25,051 votes against recall. Agree votes accounted for 40.83% of eligible voters, exceeding the 25% minimum electoral threshold to pass it. Han conceded the vote shortly after polls closed. Kuomintang chairman Johnny Chiang stated that he accepted the outcome of the recall vote, and apologized to city residents for the party's shortcomings. The New Power Party said that the recall vote was a "victory for Taiwan’s democracy." The Taiwan People's Party commented that "the recall process — from the petition to the outcome of the vote — has written a new page in the history of the autonomy of regional politics in Taiwan." Approximately five hundred supporters of Han from around Taiwan gathered in Taipei on 13 June to protest his recall and the policies of the Tsai Ing-wen presidential administration.

Former counselor to the Kaohsiung City Government  was appointed interim mayor on 13 June by the Secretary-General of the Executive Yuan, Li Meng-yen. A by-election for a new full-term mayor was held on 15 August, which was won by Chen Chi-mai.

Notes

References

Recall elections
Kaohsiung mayoral recall vote
June 2020 events in Asia
21st century in Kaohsiung
Local elections in Taiwan